Psychoma? is a 1998 album by Diary of Dreams.

Track listing

Credits

 Backing Vocals – Olaf Schäning (tracks: 4, 9, 10)
 Guitar – Adrian Hates (tracks: 2, 8, 9), Alistair Kane (tracks: 3, 5, 7 to 10), Christian Berghoff (tracks: 2, 3, 5, 7 to 10)
 Keyboards [Additional] – Olaf Schäning (tracks: 2, 5, 7 to 12)
 Mastered By – Rainer Assmann
 Music By – Olaf Schäning (tracks: 1, 4, 6, 9)
 Producer, Arranged By, Recorded By, Mastered By – Adrian Hates
 Recorded By – Olaf Schäning
 Vocals, Lyrics By, Music By – Adrian Hates

References

1998 albums
Diary of Dreams albums